Lin Yueh-ping (born 28 January 1982 in Kaohsiung, Taiwan) is a Taiwanese baseball manager and former pitcher for the Uni-President Lions of the Chinese Professional Baseball League (CPBL).

Lin is among the fastest Taiwanese pitchers of the CPBL. He consistently throws around 145 km/h (90 mph), and when needed can reach back for more and has been clocked as fast as 154 km/h (96 mph). He features a slider as his out pitch.

At the end of 2006 season, he was diagnosed with a heart condition, and underwent surgery in May 2007. Afterward, he recovered quickly and was able to do limited pitching in late season.

Family 
He married footballer Chen Hui-shan in April 2009.

He has two children.

Career statistics

Playing career

Managerial career

See also
 Chinese Professional Baseball League
 Uni-President 7-Eleven Lions

References

1982 births
2009 World Baseball Classic players
Asian Games gold medalists for Chinese Taipei
Asian Games medalists in baseball
Asian Games silver medalists for Chinese Taipei
Baseball players at the 2002 Asian Games
Baseball players at the 2006 Asian Games
Living people
Medalists at the 2002 Asian Games
Medalists at the 2006 Asian Games
Sportspeople from Kaohsiung
Uni-President 7-Eleven Lions players
Uni-President 7-Eleven Lions managers